Dereağzı can refer to:

 Dereağzı, İncirliova
 Dereağzı, Nazilli
 Dereağzı, Tavas